Dominika Cibulková was the defending champion, but she was defeated in the quarterfinals by Caroline Wozniacki.

Wozniacki went on to win the title, defeating Samantha Stosur in the final 6–2, 4–6, 7–5.

Seeds
The top four seeds received a bye into the second round.

Draw

Finals

Top half

Bottom half

Qualifying

Seeds

Qualifiers

Draw

First qualifier

Second qualifier

Third qualifier

Fourth qualifier

References
 Main Draw
 Qualifying Draw

Kremlin Cup - Singles
2012 Women's Singles